Aubrites are a group of meteorites named for Aubres, a small achondrite meteorite that fell near Nyons, France, in 1836. They are primarily composed of the orthopyroxene enstatite and are often called enstatite achondrites. Their igneous origin separates them from primitive enstatite achondrites and means they originated in an asteroid.

Aubrites are typically light-colored with a brownish fusion crust. Most aubrites are heavily brecciated; they are often said to look "lunar" in origin.

Aubrites are primarily composed of large white crystals of the Fe-poor, Mg-rich orthopyroxene, or enstatite, with minor phases of olivine, nickel-iron metal, and troilite, indicating a magmatic formation under extremely reducing conditions. The severe brecciation of most aubrites attests to a violent history for their parent body. Since some aubrites contain chondritic xenoliths, it is likely that the aubrite parent body collided with an asteroid of "F-chondritic" composition.

Comparisons of aubrite spectra to the spectra of asteroids have revealed striking similarities between the aubrite group and the E-type asteroids of the Nysa family. A small near-Earth object, 3103 Eger, is also often suggested as the parent body of the aubrites.

It has been suggested that aubrites may originate from the planet Mercury.

See also 
 Glossary of meteoritics
 3103 Eger
 44 Nysa

References

External links 

 http://www.daviddarling.info/encyclopedia/A/aubrite.html
 http://www.lpi.usra.edu/meetings/lpsc2004/pdf/1812.pdf
 https://www.uni-muenster.de/imperia/md/content/planetologie/pdf/bischoff/mess_ii_endversion.pdf

Asteroidal achondrites